Tøj & Sko was a Danish clothing and footwear store. The shop was a discount clothing store and operated 37 stores across Denmark. It was foundered in 1981, and was part of Bilka A/S, which in turn was owned by Dansk Supermarked A/S. In 2012, it was decided to close all stores.

The name "Tøj & Sko", translates to "Clothing & Footwear" in English.

See also
A.P. Møller-Mærsk
Netto
føtex
Bilka

External links
Tøj & Sko Website
Dansk Supermarked Gruppen Webpage

Retail companies established in 1981
Clothing retailers of Denmark
Companies based in Aarhus
Dansk Supermarked
Danish companies established in 1981